Sebastián Iglesias Sichel Ramírez (born 30 July 1977) is a Chilean lawyer, professor, ex minister of State and politician who served as president of the  from June 2020 until December 2020. He also previously served as Minister of Social Development and Family and executive vice president of Corfo under the second government of Sebastián Piñera. He was an independent candidate in the 2021 Chilean presidential election who ran under the centre-right  coalition.

Biography 
Born in Santiago, his parents are Antonio Alejandro José Sichel Poblete and Ana María Ramírez Alvarado. His birth name was registered as Sebastián Sichel, but his paternal surname was changed to Iglesias after his mother married Saúl Iglesias. When Sebastián Iglesias was 11 years old, he learned from his grandfather that Saúl Iglesias was not his father. He then met his biological father for the first time at age 30 and changed his paternal surname back to Sichel, but retained Iglesias as his middle name out of affection.

He studied at the María Goretti Lyceum, in Concón, and the Alexander Fleming Lyceum. Subsequently, he obtained a law degree from the Pontifical Catholic University of Chile (PUC) where he also obtained his master's degree in public law. Sichel Ramírez was a professor of constitutional law at the San Sebastián University from 2016 to 2018.

In 2008, he married the journalist Bárbara Encina. They have three children.

Political career 
In the 2013 parliamentary elections, he ran for the position of deputy for the districts of Las Condes, Vitacura and Lo Barnechea. His bid was supported by the Public Force movement. The party later became the Citizens party, which was founded by Andrés Velasco, a former minister of Michelle Bachelet.

In a controversial move, he resigned from the Christian Democratic Party in 2015, distancing himself from emblematic figures such as Claudio Orrego, whose presidential candidacy Sichel worked for in 2013. In 2016, he was on the verge of becoming a presidential candidate of the Citizens party for the 2017 Chilean general election.

On 19 November 2017, he decided to publicly support Sebastián Piñera, distancing himself from Andrés Velasco.

On 2 May 2018, during the second government of President Piñera, he became executive vice president of Corfo, becoming the first member of the Citizens party to hold public office. He took command of the lithium exploitation contracts signed by his predecessor Eduardo Bitran with the company SQM.

On 13 June 2019, he became Minister of Social Development and Family, after the cabinet change announced by President Piñera.

The new political movement was led by ex-members of Citizens who distanced themselves from Andrés Velasco.

Sichel remained BancoEstado's president until December 2020. He shortly after announced his desire to participate as an independent candidate in a primary of the centre-right coalition  (previously ) for the 2021 Chilean presidential election. On 18 July 2021, he won the coalition's primary and became its presidential candidate. He received 49% of the vote, beating three other candidates including Joaquín Lavín, who previously ran in the 1999 and 2005 presidential elections and was considered a frontrunner in the primary. Sichel is considered the favourite candidate of the private sector and is supported in his presidential campaign by prominent business figures.

In the presidential election on 21 November 2021, Sichel received 898,510 (12.79%) of votes cast, ranked fourth out of seven candidates, and did not qualify for the second round. He supported the far-right candidate José Antonio Kast in the second round.

Controversies 
In the midst of the COVID-19 pandemic in Chile and the high level of unemployment in the country, on 18 May 2020, President Sebastián Piñera announced from inside La Moneda the delivery of a family basket in aid for the entire middle class. Sichel, in his position as Minister of Social Development and Family, had to publicly correct the president's announcement, maintaining that the "percentage of the population benefited" will only have a scope for "70% of the most vulnerable 40%".

On 4 June 2020, President Piñera announced a cabinet reshuffle amid the growing coronavirus cases in Chile.

References

External links 

 Sebastian Sichel Twitter
Sebastian Sichel Webpage

Christian Democratic Party (Chile) politicians
Pontifical Catholic University of Chile alumni
21st-century Chilean lawyers
Chilean people of German descent
People from Santiago
1977 births
Living people
Citizens (Chilean political party) politicians
Candidates for President of Chile